Krishna Rao is an Indian Telugu language journalist and a political analyst.

Career
Krishna Rao works with the Telugu daily Andhra Jyothy. He has previously worked with The New Indian Express, Udayam and various papers. He is also a poet known for his poems on social issues. He won the Sahitya Akademi award in 2019. He publishes his poems using the pseudonym Krishnudu. He currently resides in New Delhi. He has a son and a daughter. He wrote three books of poetry, a book of literary criticism and a book on former Prime Minister P.V. Narasimha Rao (The Quintessential Rebel).

External links

Telugu writers
Living people
Journalists from Andhra Pradesh
1962 births